The 2010 Giro di Lombardia was the 104th edition of this single-day classic cycling race, colloquially known as the "Race of the Falling Leaves". The event took place 16 October 2010. It was the final event of the 2010 UCI World Ranking and the final major event of the 2010 road racing season.

Notable features of this race include that it runs around picturesque Lake Como in Northern Italy and includes the Madonna del Ghisallo climb (511 m of elevation gain). At the top of this climb sits the shrine of Madonna del Ghisallo (the patron saint of cyclists) that contains a large amount of cycling memorabilia. After the Madonna del Ghisallo, a new climb, the Colma di Sormano (1124 m altitude) is included in the route, replacing the Civiglio climb.

Teams

Results

References

Giro Di Lombardia, 2010
Giro di Lombardia
Giro di Lombardia